Cnemogonus is a genus of minute seed weevils in the beetle family Curculionidae. There are about five described species in Cnemogonus.

Species
These five species belong to the genus Cnemogonus:
 Cnemogonus carinirostris Hustache, 1922
 Cnemogonus cristulatus Hustache, 1922
 Cnemogonus epilobii Bedel, 1887
 Cnemogonus ferrugineus Hustache, 1922
 Cnemogonus lecontei Dietz, 1896

References

Further reading

 
 
 

Curculionidae
Articles created by Qbugbot